NGC 6256 is a globular cluster located in the constellation Scorpius. It is designated as GCL in the galaxy morphological classification scheme and was discovered by the Scottish astronomer James Dunlop on 24 June 1834. It is about 33,600 light years away from Earth.

See also 
 List of NGC objects (6001–7000)
 List of NGC objects

References

External links 
 

Globular clusters
6256
Scorpius (constellation)